Crosstown Plaza is a large strip mall in Schenectady, NY (at the Rotterdam-Schenectady line) along Watt Street and NY State Route 7 near the I-890 entrance.

Tenants
Over the years, tenants have included:

Considered as a DMV location
In mid-1990, Schenectady County considered moving a DMV office in either Crosstown Plaza, Mohawk Mall, or Rotterdam Square Mall.  However, the county legislature ultimately decided against the move.  If moved, annual rent at Crosstown Plaza would have cost $29,640.

Finding a new grocer
When Price Chopper left a space it held in the plaza for decades (moving to newly built Mohawk Commons) in March 2002, the plaza was without a grocery store.  The owners obviously needed to fill the space, but looked specifically for a grocery store over other store formats.  The population in that area was without a nearby grocery store after the Price Chopper vacancy.  A grocery store also brings in the type of frequent traffic needed to support other stores in the plaza.  After writing to numerous companies, even asking companies that typically use smaller space to consider a larger format, PriceRite happened to learn about this space.  The former Price Chopper space became PriceRite's first location in the New York Capital Region.  PriceRite later moved into the former Ames located in the same plaza in 2007.  Ocean State Job Lot later occupied the vacant PriceRite and has also expanded into space next door that was a Fay's (Later Eckerd) drugstore before that closed when Rite Aid bought the Eckerd chain.

Former Sears Hardware
Sear's Hardware vacated the plaza in 2006, leaving it empty since.  This space was frequently used for large liquidation sales for a few years.  It was announced in November 2009 that Grossman's Bargain Outlet, located on Erie Blvd., would be moving its store into the former Sears Hardware building.  It was opened in February 2010.

Ownership
As of July 1990, Crosstown Plaza was owned by Wade Lupe Construction Company, a developer in Schenectady County.  By April 1994, the construction company's name was Hexam Gardens Construction Company.

Sources

Shopping malls in New York (state)
Buildings and structures in Schenectady, New York